Big Things is the debut studio album by New Zealand music producer P-Money. It was released on 17 March 2002 through Dirty Records/Kog Transmissions. Produced entirely by P-Money, it features guest appearances from Scribe, 4 Corners, Unique, Che Fu, Deceptikonz, Patriarch, Hazaduz and Tyna.

The album peaked at number 7 on the NZ Official Top 40 Albums, and was certified Gold by the Recording Industry Association of New Zealand on 8 September 2008. It won 'Best Hip Hop Release' at bNet NZ Music Awards in 2002.

Track listing

Charts

Big Things Instrumentals

Big Things Instrumentals is the instrumental version of P-Money's first studio album Big Things. It was released in May 2003 through Dirty Records/Kog Transmissions.

Track listing

Charts

Certifications

References

P-Money albums
2002 debut albums
Albums produced by P-Money
2003 albums
Instrumental hip hop albums